Orrviken is a locality situated in Östersund Municipality, Jämtland County, Sweden with 262 inhabitants in 2010.

Actress Anna-Maria Hallgarn comes from Orrviken.

References 

Populated lakeshore places in Sweden
Populated places in Östersund Municipality
Jämtland